Metaphidippus manni is a species of jumping spider (family Salticidae) found in North America.

References

Salticidae
Spiders of North America
Spiders described in 1901